Coelostegus is an extinct genus of Late Carboniferous (late Westphalian stage) basal reptile known from Pilsen of Czech Republic. It is known from the holotype ČGH 3027, a partial skeleton of an immature individual. It was collected in the Nýřany site from the Nýřany Member of the Kladno Formation. It was first named by Robert L. Carroll and Donald Baird in 1972 and the type species is Coelostegus prothales. The most recent phylogenic study of primitive reptile relationships found Coelostegus to be the basalmost known eureptile.

References

Carboniferous reptiles of Europe
Prehistoric eureptiles
Fossil taxa described in 1972
Prehistoric reptile genera